The North Staffordshire Railway (NSR) G Class was a class of 4-4-0 steam locomotives designed by John H. Adams, third son of William Adams. The G Class was the first 4-4-0 class of locomotive designed for the NSR, and they superseded older 2-4-0s on the heaviest passenger traffic expresses on the railway between Crewe and Llandudno non-stop. The NSR introduced bogie stock to this route in 1906, resulting in much heavier trains.

In LMS days the class received the usual substitution of Ramsbottom safety valves for Ross-pop, and also the addition of an extra small spectacle plate on each side of the cab front.

The livery of the G Class was the NSR's Madder Lake with straw lining, and NORTH STAFFORD lettering on the tender along with the company crest. The number appeared on the cabside. In LMS days  they received the standard Crimson lake passenger livery with large numerals on the tender and the company crest on the cabside. They were renumbered twice in LMS ownership; once, upon grouping, and again in 1928 to make way for the LMS 2P 4-4-0s being built at the time. As a result, they were renumbered in the series following on from the LNWR George the Fifth Class.

List of Locomotives

References

North Staffordshire Railway
4-4-0 locomotives
Railway locomotives introduced in 1910
Standard gauge steam locomotives of Great Britain
Scrapped locomotives